Niamtougou is a market town in and district capital of Doufelgou District (Préfecture), in the Kara Region of Togo. Niamtougou market is the one of largest in the region and is held every Sunday.

Geography
Niamtougou is composed of six villages that are in close proximity to each other: Niamtougou, Koka, Baga, Ténéga, Yaka, and Agbandé.

Government
Niamtougou is the district capital of Doufelgou District and houses facilities of the Interior, Education, and Rural Development Ministries. The district's administrative offices, including the office and residence of the District Governor (Préfet), are located in Koka.

Economy
Niamtougou Market is second only to Ketao Market in its importance in the Kara Region. While market day is weekly on Sunday, there is significant daily activity.

Transportation
As of March 2021 it did not have regularly scheduled commercial flights. Niamtougou is on the nation's main north–south road, Route Nationale No. 1. Secondary roads leaving Niamtougou connect to the agricultural communities of Siou, Pouda, Massadéna, and Tchitchirra and the crossroads market town of Kouméa.

Demographics
Niamtougou, Koka, Baga, and Ténéga are composed principally of speakers of Nawdm (Losso) while Yaka and Agbandé are composed of Lamba-speakers. Most of Niamtougou's Christian population is Roman Catholic. There is a mosque (masjid) in the center of Niamtougou across from the market. Most Muslims in Niamtougou are merchants or civil servants who are not originally from the area.

Education
There are numerous public elementary schools and a secondary school (lycée). In addition, there is a Roman Catholic mission elementary school and a large Roman Catholic church. The largest Secondary school is "lycee Niamtougou".

Health
There is a modest hospital and a small state hotel.

Sports
Football is the most popular sport in town, which is home to Kakadlé FC. Its main football field has a capacity around 1,000.

Gallery

References

Populated places in Kara Region
Kara Region